Orthocarpus imbricatus is a species of flowering plant in the broomrape family known by the common name mountain owl's-clover. It is native to western North America from British Columbia to northern California, where it grows in meadows and other mountain habitat.

Description
It is an annual herb producing a slender, hairy green stem up to about 35 centimeters tall. The lance-shaped leaves are up to 5 centimeters long. The inflorescence is a dense cylindrical spike of wide netted bracts with pinkish tips. The flowers just barely emerge from between the bracts. Each flower is about a centimeter long, its narrow, hooked, beaklike upper lip pink and its expanded, pouched lower lip yellowish.

External links
Jepson Manual Treatment
USDA Plants Profile
Photo gallery

Orobanchaceae
Flora of the Western United States
Flora of California
Flora of British Columbia
Flora of North America
Flora without expected TNC conservation status